Frank Magrath (18 May 1901 – 21 March 1974) was an Australian rules footballer who played with Hawthorn in the Victorian Football League (VFL).

Notes

External links 

1901 births
1974 deaths
Australian rules footballers from Victoria (Australia)
Hawthorn Football Club players
Australian rules footballers from Tasmania